The following lists events that happened during 2018 in South Africa.

Incumbents

National Government 
 President of South Africa
 Jacob Zuma (ANC) – until 14 February
 Cyril Ramaphosa (ANC) – from 15 February
 Acting President: Cyril Ramaphosa (ANC) – 14–15 February
 Deputy President
 Cyril Ramaphosa (ANC) – until 15 February
 David Mabuza (ANC) – since February
 Leader of the Opposition: Mmusi Maimane (DA)
 Chief Justice: Mogoeng Mogoeng
 Deputy Chief Justice: Raymond Zondo
 President of the Supreme Court of Appeal: Mandisa Maya
 Deputy President of the Supreme Court of Appeal: Vacant
 Chairperson of the Electoral Court of South Africa: Khayelihle Kenneth Mthiyane
 Speaker of the National Assembly: Baleka Mbete (ANC)
 Chairperson of the National Council of Provinces: Thandi Modise (ANC)

Cabinet 
The Cabinet, together with the President and the Deputy President, forms part of the Executive.

National Assembly

Provincial Premiers 
 Eastern Cape Province: Phumulo Masualle (ANC) 
 Free State Province: Ace Magashule (ANC) 
 Gauteng Province: David Makhura (ANC) 
 KwaZulu-Natal Province: Willies Mchunu (ANC) 
 Limpopo Province: Stanley Mathabatha (ANC) 
 Mpumalanga Province: David Mabuza (ANC) 
 North West Province: Supra Mahumapelo (ANC) 
 Northern Cape Province: Sylvia Lucas (ANC) 
 Western Cape Province: Helen Zille (DA)

Predicted and scheduled events 
Events that are scheduled to occur in 2018 in South Africa.

February 
 8 February – The President of South Africa is set to deliver the State of the Nation address to a joint sitting of the National Assembly and the National Council of Provinces, at 19:00. (A new date will be announced, after the Speaker of the National Assembly announced that the address are postponed.)
 21 February – The Minister of Finance, Malusi Gigaba, is set to deliver the Budget Speech.

Events 
The following lists events that happened during 2018 in South Africa.

January 
 5 January – The first Test match in the series between South Africa and India takes place in Cape Town (Newlands Cricket Ground). South Africa win the match within four days, by 72 runs.
 9 January – President Jacob Zuma announces a commission of inquiry into allegations of State capture. He selects Deputy Chief Justice Raymond Zondo to head the commission.
 13 January – The new President of the African National Congress, Cyril Ramaphosa delivered the ANC  "January 8 statement" in East London, Eastern Cape.
 13 January – The second Test match in the series between South Africa and India takes place in Centurion (SuperSport Park). South Africa win the match 135 runs.
 24 January – The third Test match in the series between South Africa and India takes place in Johannesburg (Wanderers Cricket Ground). India win the match by 63 runs. South Africa win the Test series 2–1.

February 
 1 February – The first ODI match in the series between South Africa and India takes place in Durban (Kingsmead Cricket Ground). India win the match by 6 wickets.
 4 February – The second ODI match in the series between South Africa and India takes place in Centurion (SuperSport Park). India win the match by 9 wickets. South Africa's score of 118/10 becomes South Africa's lowest score in South Africa by South Africa.
 6 February – The Speaker of the National Assembly announces that the State of the Nation address is postponed to a later date.
 13 February – The Secretary-General of the ANC, Ace Magashule, officially announces that the National Executive Committee of the ANC has officially recalled Jacob Zuma as President of South Africa. He is given until the end of the day to step down as president.
 14 February – Jacob Zuma announces his resignation as President of South Africa, after a speech of about 25 minutes, just before 23:00. In resigning his position, he effectively evaded a vote of no confidence that was to be supported by his own party. According to Section 90(1) of the Constitution of South Africa, Deputy President Cyril Ramaphosa became Acting President of South Africa.
 15 February – Cyril Ramaphosa is sworn in as President of South Africa.
 16 February – President Cyril Ramaphosa delivers his first State of the Nation Address.

April
 4 – 15 April South Africa competes in the 2018 Commonwealth Games in Gold Coast, Queensland, Australia.

May 

 23 May – South African cricketer, AB de Villiers who is recognised as one of the greatest batsmen in modern-day cricket suddenly announced his retirement from international cricket at the age of 34.

July 

 20 July – Inkatha Freedom Party (IFP) stated that the time had come to discuss the possibility of reinstating the death penalty in South Africa.

August 

 8 August – The National Freedom Party calls for bringing back the death penalty in South Africa after the death of Khensani Maseko, in a similar call to one made by the IFP weeks ago.
 20 August
 Hearings at the Zondo Commission of Inquiry into State Capture start

Deaths

January 
 3 January
 Mlungisi Bali, 27, Rugby union player (Griffons, Border Bulldogs), stabbing.
 Keorapetse Kgositsile, 79, Poet and journalist.
 Lara Kruger, 30, Disc jockey (Motsweding FM) and transgender rights activist.
 9 January
 Gerald Morkel, 76, politician, Premier of the Western Cape (1998–2001), Mayor of Cape Town (2001–2002).
 13 January 
 John Desmond "Jack" Nel, 89, Cricketer.
 18 January 
 Lucas Mangope, 94, politician, President of Bophuthatswana (1977–1994).
 19 January
 Dik Abed, 73, South African-born Dutch cricketer.
 20 January
 Harry Selby, 92, Hunter and Safari guide.
 21 January
 David Pithey, 81, Cricketer.
 23 January
 Hugh Masekela, 78, Jazz trumpeter ("Grazing in the Grass", "Bring Him Back Home") and composer ("Soweto Blues").
 25 January
 Sandy Mokwena, 68, Actor ("Yizo Yizo" and e.tv's "Scandal!").
 29 January
 Clive van Ryneveld, 89, Cricketer (National team, 1951–1958), rugby union player (England national rugby union team) and politician (United Party and Progressive Party).
 31 January
 David Phetoe, 85, Actor ("Generations", "Sgudi Snyasi" and "Cry, The Beloved Country").

February 
 1 February
 John Jacob Lavranos, 91, Insurance broker and botanist.
 12 February 
 Mogau Tshehla, 26, Footballer.
 17 February
 Sampie Terreblanche, 84, Economist and writer.

March 
 8 March
 Peter Temple, 71, South African-born Australian writer (The Broken Shore, Truth, White Dog), Miles Franklin Award winner (2010), Gold Dagger (2006).
 13 March 
 Matthew Lester, educator, tax expert and financial columnist (The Sunday Times).
 19 March 
 Madge Bester, 54, disability rights activist, once world's shortest woman.

April 
 2 April
 Winnie Madikizela-Mandela, 81, Anti-apartheid activist and politician, MP (since 2009),.
 3 April
 Pam Golding, 90, Real estate developer, founder of Pam Golding Properties.
 11 April 
 Zola Skweyiya, 75, Politician.
 28 April
 Akhumzi Jezile, 29, actor & television personality, car crash.

August 

 13 August 
 Mark Minnie, 37, former narcotics branch policeman and co-author of The Lost Boys of Bird Island, dies from apparent suicide
 15 August 
 Veronica Sobukwe, 91, nurse, political activist and wife to Robert Sobukwe

Public holidays in South Africa, 2018 

 1 January – Monday, New Year's Day
 21 March – Wednesday, Human Rights Day
 30 March – Friday, Good Friday
 2 April – Monday, Family Day (Easter Monday)
 27 April – Friday, Freedom Day
 1 May – Tuesday, Labour Day
 16 June – Saturday, Youth Day
 9 August – Thursday, National Women's Day
 24 September – Monday, Heritage Day
 16 December – Sunday, Day of Reconciliation
 17 December – Monday, Public holiday
 25 December – Tuesday, Christmas Day
 26 December – Wednesday, Day of Good Will

References

South Africa
2010s in South Africa
Years of the 21st century in South Africa